Antônio de Oliveira Filho (born 5 October 1960), better known as Careca, is a Brazilian former footballer, who was deployed as a forward. During his career, Careca played for several clubs, most notably with Italian side Napoli. He also represented the Brazil national football team on over 60 occasions.

Club career
Careca began his footballing career in his home state of São Paulo with local side Guarani in 1978. With his finishing ability and devastating pace quickly established himself as one of his country's best young strikers. With Guarani, he won the Brazilian Championship during his first season and the Brazilian Second Division in 1981.

By 1983 he had been signed by São Paulo, he continued to gather notoriety because of his impressive goals to games ratio and by 1986, Careca led São Paulo to the Brazilian Championship, beating his former club Guarani in the final. He was awarded Bola de Ouro the same year, which is the Brazilian equivalent of Footballer of the Year.

Move to Napoli
In the summer of 1987 Careca moved to Italian Serie A champions Napoli, where he was part of the "Ma-Gi-Ca" forward lineup with Bruno Giordano and Diego Maradona. Careca's first season at Napoli was an unsuccessful one, despite his 13 goals: the team were knocked out in the first round of the European Cup by Real Madrid and they lost the title in the final games of the season.

However, his second season was far more successful. The team won the UEFA Cup, with Careca scoring a goal in each leg of the final, one a memorable lobbed goal, and finished second in Serie A, also reaching the Coppa Italia final that season. In 1990, Careca finally won the Scudetto with Napoli, following the success up with the first ever Supercoppa Italiana later that year. Careca spent a further three years with Napoli, establishing a partnership with Gianfranco Zola, during which Napoli failed to win any silverware.

Later stages of playing career
In 1993 Careca left Italy to play for new Japanese J.League team Kashiwa Reysol. Careca spent three years with the team, during which time he helped them to promotion to the J1 league in 1994. He returned to Brazil in 1997 with Santos, he spent a year with the club and another year with Cambinas (1998) before joining the lower-league team São José (RS), where he finished his career in 1999.

Careca retired having played 64 games for Brazil, and scored 30 goals.

Garforth Town owner and manager, Simon Clifford, persuaded Careca to play the majority of a friendly game against Guiseley in the summer of 2005.

Footballing name
The word careca is Portuguese for 'bald'. It was a nickname given to Careca as a child because of his admiration for a famous Brazilian clown of the same name.

Other Carecas
Two contemporaries of Careca, who like him played for the Brazil national football team, were also called Careca and are thus sometimes confused with him: Careca II and Careca Bianchezi.

International career
Careca first broke into the national side of Brazil during 1982, but was forced to miss the 1982 World Cup in Spain due to a thigh injury suffered in practice three days before Brazil's debut in that tournament. His place in the squad for that tournament was taken by Roberto Dinamite. He was also part of the Brazilian squad that came in second in the 1983 Copa América.

It was during the 1986 World Cup, in Mexico, that Careca really established himself in world football. He ended the tournament, during which Brazil were memorably eliminated on penalties by France at the quarter-final stage, with five goals which placed him second in the Golden Boot rankings behind England's Gary Lineker. In 1990, Careca was part of the Brazilian team that was defeated by Argentina in the second round. He scored two goals in the tournament. His last cap was earned in August 1993.

Style of play
Careca is regarded as one of the greatest strikers in the history of Brazilian football. He was a prolific, fast, opportunistic, and powerful striker, with excellent technique and great striking ability. Despite being right-footed, he was also capable of scoring with his left foot, and he was known for his ability to score goals off-balance from angled shots even when running with the ball. Careca was also good in the air, and he had an excellent positional sense, which along with his intelligence, sense of space, and attacking movement, made him known for frequently being in the right position at the right time in the penalty area. Although he was usually deployed as a striker, he was also capable of playing in deeper positions, as a creative forward, due to his ability to play off of his teammates and provide them with assists, as well as his tendency to make attacking runs starting from outside the area in order to create space for other players. After scoring a goal, Careca often celebrated by mimicking an aeroplane's wings with his arms outstretched.

Career statistics

Club

International

Honours

Club
Guarani
Campeonato Brasileiro Série A: 1978

São Paulo
Campeonato Brasileiro Série A: 1986
Campeonato Paulista: 1985, 1987

Napoli
Serie A: 1989–90
Supercoppa Italiana: 1990
UEFA Cup: 1988–89

Individual
Bola de Prata: 1982, 1985
Campeonato Paulista Top Scorer: 1985
Bola de Ouro: 1986
Campeonato Brasileiro Série A Top Scorer: 1986
FIFA World Cup Silver Boot: 1986
South American Team of the Year: 1986

References

External links

 

1960 births
Living people
People from Araraquara
Brazilian footballers
Brazilian expatriate footballers
Guarani FC players
São Paulo FC players
Campeonato Brasileiro Série A players
Campeonato Brasileiro Série B players
S.S.C. Napoli players
Serie A players
Santos FC players
1986 FIFA World Cup players
1990 FIFA World Cup players
1983 Copa América players
1987 Copa América players
J1 League players
Japan Football League (1992–1998) players
Kashiwa Reysol players
Expatriate footballers in Italy
Expatriate footballers in Japan
Brazilian expatriate sportspeople in Italy
Brazil international footballers
Association football forwards
Sport Club Barueri players
UEFA Cup winning players
Footballers from São Paulo (state)